Murray Adaskin,  (March 28, 1906 – May 6, 2002) was a Toronto-born Canadian violinist, composer, conductor and teacher. After playing violin with a band, he studied composition and became the director of the Music department of the University of Saskatchewan. Many of his compositions were written while in Victoria after his retirement.

Life

Born in Toronto, Ontario, to Jewish Latvian immigrant parents who raised their four children to become persevering kids, Adaskin studied the violin with Alexander Chuhaldin at the Toronto Conservatory of Music. He began his career playing the violin in silent film presentations in his native city. Afterwards, he was a violinist with the Toronto Symphony Orchestra from 1923 to 1936. He married his first wife, soprano Frances James, around that time. From 1938 to 1952 he was with the Royal York Hotel trio. Adaskin attended the Music Academy of the West in 1950.

By 38 years of age, he studied for seven years with John Weinzweig to become a composer. Other composers he studied with include Charles Jones and Darius Milhaud. He was head of the Department of Music at the University of Saskatchewan from 1952 to 1966, including four years as conductor of the Saskatoon Symphony Orchestra. He then became the Composer-in-Residence until 1972, the first position of its type ever created at a Canadian university. Among his notable pupils were composers Boyd McDonald, Paul Pedersen, Rodney Sharman and Timothy Williams; and violinist Andrew Dawes.  By 1972, he retired to Victoria where he started composing more than half his total of 130 compositions.

Adaskin lost his first wife in 1988, to later remarry to a woman named Dorothea, who was his helping hand in recording some pieces on their own label. He died in 2002, just before the release of two CDs of a five-disc collection for his memory. He is the brother of Harry Adaskin, Leslie Adaskin and John Adaskin.

It was announced on December 15, 1980 that he was awarded the Order of Canada.  On April 8, 1981, Adaskin was invested as an Officer of the Order of Canada.

Music inspiration

Igor Stravinsky was a major inspiration for Adaskin.  "Stravinsky's neo-classical and rugged rhythms echo through his work."  Additionally, his training as a violinist affected his sense of melody. Through his works, one can feel the presence of landscapes, birdsongs and different local surrounding sounds.

The melody of his compositions often seem abstract, similar to Canadian visual art from his early years. His avid interest in Canadian visual art was expressed in his work: In Praise of Canadian Painting in the Thirties.

Selected works

 Epitaph for voice and piano (1948)
 March No.1 for orchestra (1950)
 Sonata for Piano (1950)
 Sonatine Baroque for violin solo (1952) or viola solo (1999)
 March No.2 for orchestra (1953, revised 1962)
 Rondino for Nine Instruments (1961)
 Dedication (1963)
 Daydreams for alto saxophone and piano (1971)
 Woodwind Quintet No.1 (1974)
 Rankin Inlet for piano duet (1978)
 Eskimo Melodies for piano (1980)
 March No.3 for orchestra (1981)
 Vocalise No.1 for solo viola (1990)
 Concerto No.1 for viola and orchestra (1991)
 Three Piano Pieces (Savannah, Gretchen, and Etude No. 1), for Piano (1992)
 Concerto No.2 for viola and orchestra (1995)
 String Quintet (1995)
 Duo for viola and guitar (1996)
 Vocalise No.2 for solo viola (1996)
 Divertimento No.9 for string trio (1998)
 Duo for viola and piano (1999)
 Finki, Where Are You? for 2 violas (2000)
 Musica Victoria (2000)

See also
 Music of Canada
 List of Canadian composers

Footnotes

Citations

References

External links
 University of Saskatchewan: The Murray Adaskin Collection

1906 births
2002 deaths
Canadian male classical composers
Canadian classical violinists
Male classical violinists
Canadian people of Latvian-Jewish descent
Jewish Canadian musicians
Jewish classical composers
Musicians from Toronto
Officers of the Order of Canada
People from Old Toronto
Pupils of Darius Milhaud
The Royal Conservatory of Music alumni
Academic staff of the University of Saskatchewan
20th-century classical composers
20th-century classical violinists
20th-century Canadian composers
Music Academy of the West alumni
20th-century Canadian male musicians
20th-century Canadian violinists and fiddlers
Canadian male violinists and fiddlers